Shravani Subramanya is a 2013 Indian Kannada-language romantic comedy film written and directed by Manju Swaraj and produced by K. A Suresh under his home production banner Suresh Arts Productions. The film features Ganesh and Amulya in lead roles. This is the second collaboration of both stars after the 2007 blockbuster hit Cheluvina Chittara. Amulya makes her comeback after a hiatus through this film.

The film features the score and soundtrack composed by V. Harikrishna. The principal photography of the film began at Mysore around the Lalit Mahal palace and has been progressing at a brisk pace in the same city. The first teaser of the film was released on YouTube website by the producer on 29 June 2013. Amulya won Best Actress Award at 61st Filmfare Awards South for her Performance.

Plot
Shravani is a final-year college student in Mandya who is the daughter of Kempegowda, who is the head of the village. She always plays pranks and is loved by her family. Subramanya is a aspiring musician in Mysore who aspires to be a music director tries to impress the music directors with his skills, but to no avail. Shravani is smitten by Sudeep where he proposes to her. Though initially taken aback, they decide to elope. However, she learns that Sudeep is actually a womaniser/gangster where she tries to escape. Sudeep captures her, but is saved by Subramanya, who thrashes Sudeep. Shravani jumps into a river to commit suicide but Subramanya saves her.

Shravani tells that her parents will kill her if they learn that she was eloping with a gangster. Subramanya tells Shravani that he will pretend to be her lover for the time being and will divulge everything to Kempegowda, and also ask Shravani to wear a fake mangalsutra. Believing the story, an enraged Kempegowda throws them out. Subramanya drops Shravani at her aunt's house in Mysore, but to no avail. With Govinda's help, they decide to masquarde as a couple to Seetharam and Anuradha, who agrees to lease them the house for free. Time passes by, Shravani and Subramanya grow close to each other. While thrashing Sudeep (who wants to exact revenge on Shravani) Subramanya meets Kempegowda and his brothers where he reveals the truth.

Kempegowda and brothers realize their mistake and they take Shravani back to their house, leaving Shravani and Subramanya devastated. Subramanya is unable to cope up with the loss of Shravani, Seetharam reveals that they knew Shravani and Subramanya are not married couple, but offered them to stay as they looked after them like their parents. Seetharam, Anuradha and Subramanya convinces Kempegowda and the family about Shravani getting married to Subramanya. After seeing Subramanya's unconditional love for Shravani. Kempegowda allows the couple to reunite and agrees for their marriage, much to the happiness of the household. Thus Shravani and Subramanya reunite in the end.

Cast
 Ganesh as Subramanya
 Amulya as Shravani
 Anant Nag as Seetharam
 Tara as Anuradha
 Avinash as Kempegowda
 Yashas as Sudeep
 Vinaya Prasad
 Sadhu Kokila as Govinda
 Neenasam Ashwath as Kumara
Amith Vishwanath as Mango Seller 
Mamatha Ravuth as Komala, Govinda's Lover 
Suryakala Neenaasam
Shanthamma as Shravani's Grandmother 
Renuka Prasad 
V. Manohar as Special Appearance 
 Parul Yadav
Arjun Janya as himself (Cameo Appearance)

Production

Launch
Director Manju Swaraj, who earlier directed a critically acclaimed film, Shishira announced the name of Shravani Subramanya in early 2012. He also refuted the rumors of a possible remake of Telugu film with the same name, Itlu Sravani Subramanyam. He roped in Ganesh and Amulya, thus re-uniting the pair after Cheluvina Chittara and also got the senior actors Ananth Nag and Tara do the other pivotal roles.

Filming
The film was shot in and around the Mysore city. The crew has shot in Lalith Mahal Road and St Philomena Church, among others.

Release
The film was released worldwide. In Karnataka it released around 95+ screens, and next week it added around 43 screens. It also released in USA Germany and UK.

Soundtrack

V. Harikrishna composed the music for the film and the soundtracks. The soundtrack album marks the re-entry of veteran playback singer Manjula Gururaj after ten years. The album consists of four soundtracks.

Critical response
Shravani Subramanya received positive reviews from critics upon its release. B. S. Srivani of Deccan Herald gave the film a rating of four out of five and praised the roles of all the departments in the film and wrote, "Shravani seems to be tailor made for Amulya. She is the perfect foil for Ganesh, who is in fine form here." G. Arun Kumar of The Times of India too gave the film a rating of four stars out of five and wrote, "Ganesh makes a lasting impression on the viewer with his effortless performance, it is Amulya who steals the show with her bubbly act." Shyam Prasad S. of Bangalore Mirror gave the film a rating of 3.5/5 and praised the roles of directing, acting and the music departments in the film.

Box office
Shravani Subramanya opened to decent occupation all over Karnataka. The film was one of the major blockbusters of 2013.

Home media
Shravani Subramanya was released in DVD with Dolby Digital DTS 5.1 audio and with English subtitles. The movie was also released in 3 in 1 DVD and VCD.

References

External links
 

Films set in Bangalore
2013 romantic comedy films
2013 films
Films scored by V. Harikrishna
Films directed by Manju Swaraj
2010s Kannada-language films
Indian romantic comedy films